The 2018 FC Astana season is the tenth successive season that the club will play in the Kazakhstan Premier League, the highest tier of association football in Kazakhstan. Astana are defending Kazakhstan Premier League Champions, having been crowned Champions for the forth time the previous season. Astana will continue in the UEFA Europa League having finished second in their group at the end of the 2017 season. In the summer Astana will enter the Champions League, at the Second Qualifying Stage, and the Kazakhstan Cup.

Season events
On 8 January, Stoilov signed a new contract with Astana, but left to take over the vacant Kazakhstan nation team Managers position on 1 March, with Grigori Babayan being announced as his interim replacement on the same day. On 1 June 2018, Astana announced Roman Hryhorchuk as the club's new manager.

On 25 June, FC Tambov announced that Marat Bystrov had left to join Astana on a three-year contract, whilst also being rented to FC Tobol until the end of the 2018 season.

Igor Shitov left Astana on 3 July after his contract was not renewed, with Astana signing Antonio Rukavina and Richard Almeida the following day.

On 12 July, Astana announced that Junior Kabananga had re-joined Astana on a year-long loan deal from Al-Nassr.

On 14 July, Astana announced that Pedro Henrique had joined Astana on a year-long loan deal from PAOK.

On 20 July, Astana announced the signing of Rangelo Janga from KAA Gent.

On 23 July, Astana announced that Đorđe Despotović and Marko Stanojević had both left the club.

On 27 July, Astana confirmed that their all-time leading goalscorer Patrick Twumasi had moved to La Liga club Deportivo Alavés, the following day Yuriy Pertsukh was loaned to Atyrau.

On 17 August, Hryhorchuk left Astana on compassionate leave with Grigori Babayan again stepping in as Caretaker Manager.

Squad

On loan

Transfers

In

Out

Loans in

Loans out

Released

Friendlies

Competitions

UEFA Europa League

Knockout phase

Super Cup

Premier League

Results summary

Results by round

Results

League table

Kazakhstan Cup

UEFA Champions League

Qualifying rounds

UEFA Europa League

Qualifying rounds

Group stage

Squad statistics

Appearances and goals

|-
|colspan="14"|Players away from Astana on loan:

|-
|colspan="14"|Players who left Astana during the season:

|}

Goal scorers

Clean sheets

Disciplinary record

References

External links
Official Website 
Official VK

FC Astana seasons
Astana
Astana
Astana